Christopher Good is an English actor best known for his work on television.
He was born in Bromsgrove in Worcestershire.
In the 1970s he made a stage appearance in a musical version of Jeeves and Wooster. In the 90s he was, according to the Times, one of the most energetic Falstaffs ever.
Mr. Good has made many one-off or short-lived appearances in drama and comedy programmes, with Murder Most Horrid, Rumpole of the Bailey, Danger UXB, The Choir and Pie in the Sky being among them. He appeared in The Beast Below, an episode of the 2010 series of Doctor Who.

He is arguably best known for his role as Quentin Kirrin in the 1990s television adaptation of The Famous Five, Enid Blyton novels in which he appeared in eighteen episodes.

In retirement he has restored an old mill and created a large and wonderful garden in Herefordshire.

Selected TV and filmography
 Budgie (1972) – 1st Constable / Factory Gateman
 Six Days of Justice (1973) – Mr. Barrington-Smith
 Upstairs, Downstairs (1974) – Captain Philip Hanning
 A Bridge Too Far (1977) – Major Carlyle
 Casting the Runes (1979) - John Harrington 
 Danger UXB (1979) – Captain West / Major
 Juliet Bravo (1980) – Tony Woodward
 Secret Army – "The Last Run" (1979) – Flight Sergeant Tucker
 Brideshead Revisited (1981) – Collins
 Victor/Victoria (1982) – Stage Manager
 Gandhi (1982) – Young Englishman
 Bullshot (1983) – Lord Binky Brancaster
 Diana (1984) – Alistair
 Miss Marple – "The Murder at the Vicarage" and "The Mirror Crack'd From Side To Side" (1986, 1992) – Christopher Hawes 
 Murder Most Horrid (1991) – Leonard
 The Famous Five (1995–1997) – Quentin
 Possession (2002) – Crabb-Robinson
 Dr Jekyll and Mr Hyde (2002) – Dr Brown 
 Midsomer Murders (2003) – Simon Smythe-Webster
 The Trial of the King Killers (2005) – Sir Purbeck Temple
 Egypt (2005) – Thomas Young
 Rosemary & Thyme (2006) – The Dean
 Famous 5: On the Case (2008)
 Doctor Who: The Beast Below (2010) – Morgan

References

External links
 

Living people
1956 births
English male television actors